WIII (99.9 MHz), branded as I-100, is a commercial FM radio station licensed to Cortland, New York, and serving Central New York.  WIII has a classic rock radio format, with some post-2000 rock songs occasionally heard.  It is owned by Cayuga Radio Group subsidiary of Saga Communications.

WIII has an effective radiated power (ERP) of 26,000 watts.  Programming is also heard on 250-watt FM translator W262AD at 100.3 MHz in Ithaca, New York.

History
Its original call sign was WKRT-FM, the counterpart to WKRT 920 AM (now WYBY). The two stations simulcast a full service, middle of the road format of popular music, news and sports. They were owned by Radio Cortland, Inc.

The station later broke away with its own programming.  In 1994, it changed its call letters to WIII.  In the 1990s, WKRT and WIII were owned by Citadel Broadcasting.  In 2007, Citadel decided to sell its stations in the Ithaca market to Saga Communications.  Because of market ownership caps, Saga donated WYBY to the Bible Broadcasting Network, while keeping WIII.

The WIII call letters have been in place since November 1994 - prior to that it was WKRT-FM, WYYS, WNYP-FM and WOKW.

The station line up is:  Mornings:  The Bob & Tom Show syndicated from WFBQ Indianapolis, followed by Kat Walters and "The Working Stiff Show", at nights featuring "The Rock n Roll Hot Tub" and overnights with "The Third Shift".  A popular feature is Kat Walters' "5 O'Clock Free For All" with theme sets picked by listeners via Facebook.  WIII joined the New York Giants Radio Network in 2012.

WIII is popular with regional live music venues and concert promoters including:  the State Theatre, DSP Shows, CMAC, TAGS, and del Lago Casino.

Kat Walters is the Brand Manager.  Chet Osadchey is the President and General Manager.

Translator
WIII also broadcasts on the following translator:

References

External links
I-100 - Official Site

III
Classic rock radio stations in the United States
Radio stations established in 1987